Flaka Pruthi (born 30 June 1999) is a Kosovan swimmer. She competed in the women's 100 metre freestyle event at the 2017 World Aquatics Championships.

References

1999 births
Living people
Kosovan female swimmers
Place of birth missing (living people)
Kosovan female freestyle swimmers
Swimmers at the 2015 European Games
European Games competitors for Kosovo